The Federal Agency for Fishery (Rosrybolovstvo) is a federal body that exercises oversight over fishing and marine life in waters under the territory of the Russian Federation, excluding internal seas as well as the Caspian and Azov seas. It was formed on May 12, 2008 as part of Russia's Ministry of Agriculture.

References

External links 
 Official website  

2008 establishments in Russia
Government agencies established in 2008
Government agencies of Russia